Zsuzsanna Tiba  (born 31 March 1976) is a Hungarian female water polo player. She was a member of the Hungary women's national water polo team. She was a part of the  team at the 2004 Summer Olympics. On club level she played for Dunaújvárosi FVE in Hungary.

See also
 List of World Aquatics Championships medalists in water polo

References

External links
 

1976 births
Living people
Hungarian female water polo players
Water polo players at the 2004 Summer Olympics
Olympic water polo players of Hungary
Water polo players from Budapest